Harry Willis Miller (July 1, 1879 – January 1, 1977) was an American physician, thyroid surgeon and Seventh-day Adventist missionary. Miller was a vegetarian and pioneer in the development of soy milk.

Biography

Miller was born in Ludlow Falls, Ohio on July 1, 1879. He graduated M.D. from the American Medical Missionary College in Battle Creek, in 1902. Miller studied at Rush Medical College and authored an article on blastomycetes in the Journal of Dermatology in 1903. With his wife Maude Thompson Miller, he went to Shanghai in 1903. She died less than two years later from sprue. Miller married Marie Iverson in 1908 and he remained in China until 1956. He specialized in surgery and as a missionary generalist. He served as a leader of the SDA Church in China. It is estimated that Miller performed 6,000 thyroid operations.

He served as superintendent of the China Mission in Shanghai (1908-1909) and established the China Training Institute in Chouchiakou. He returned to the United States in 1911. Miller was medical director and secretary of Washington Sanitarium (1913–1925). He returned to China in 1925 and managed the Shanghai Hospital and Sanitarium. Miller researched the production of soy milk and published an article in the Chinese Medical Journal on a soy infant formula in 1936. Miller is credited in 1936 with starting the first production of soy milk in Shanghai.

Miller returned to the United States in 1939. He was medical director of Mount Vernon Hospital and established the International Nutrition Laboratory to produce
soy products. With his son he formed the International Nutrition Foundation on a 140-acre farm in Mount Vernon. The soy farm produced canned and malted soy milk. His first American soy milk product was known as Soyalac in 1941.

Miller administered hospitals in Shanghai, Hankow and Hubei. He established the Taiwan Adventist Hospital in 1949. He sold his factory, land, and soy milk products to Loma Linda Foods in 1951. Loma Linda Foods was owned by the Seventh-day Adventist Church. However, Miller continued to conduct research in at Loma Linda Food factory in La Sierra until his death. In 1956, he was awarded the Blue Star of China by Chiang Kai-shek. In 1960, Miller helped in forming the Hong Kong Adventist Hospital. In total there were 19 hospitals that Miller was instrumental in starting all over the Far East. 

A biography of Miller was published in 1961. Miller died in Riverside, California on January 1, 1977.

Vegetarianism

Miller stated that he became a vegetarian for its health and longevity aspects. He was a pioneer in popularizing soy milk as a satisfactory substitute for animal milk and making it available to feed the poor in areas where there was no cow's milk. He conducted research on vegetarian meat substitutes and proteins. He was influential in bringing soy-based foods to the United States.

Selected publications

The Way to Health (1920)
Tuberculosis: A Curable Disease (1954)

References

Further reading

Raymond S. Moore. (1961). China Doctor: The Life Story of Harry Willis Miller. Harper & Bros.
Robert Peterson. (1961). Interview with Harry Willis Miller. Pascagoula Chronicle-Star and Moss Point Advertiser.

1879 births
1977 deaths
20th-century American physicians
American health and wellness writers
American nutritionists
American Seventh-day Adventist missionaries
American Seventh-day Adventists
American surgeons
American vegetarianism activists
Christian medical missionaries
Christian vegetarianism
Rush Medical College alumni
Seventh-day Adventist missionaries in China
Seventh-day Adventist missionaries in Taiwan
Seventh-day Adventists in health science